Route 83 is a  north–south state highway in the Greater Hartford and Greater Springfield areas of the U.S. states of Connecticut and Massachusetts. It serves as the main north–south artery for the towns of Manchester, Vernon, Ellington, and Somers, and continues through East Longmeadow center into downtown Springfield. The route in Massachusetts is town-maintained, except for the ramps connecting to U.S. Route 5 parallel to Interstate 91.

Route description

Route 83 begins at the southern end of New London Turnpike in Glastonbury near its junction with Route 2 at exit 10. After crossing Route 2, it then heads north and crosses Route 94 before entering Manchester, where it serves as the main north–south thoroughfare of the town. Just before the center of town, it intersects I-384 at exit 3. Within the town center of Manchester, a  segment is town maintained between Hartford Road and Center St, the latter of which carries US 6/44, the town's main east–west thoroughfare. It then continues north, and comes to a junction with Route 30 at I-84 exit 63. It then continues north in Vernon as a 4-lane road where it narrows to 2 lanes shortly before a 0.81 mile overlap with Route 74. It then turns north once again on the western edge of Rockville Center, and crosses into Ellington, where it has junctions with the northern end of Route 286, and with Route 140 in the center of town. It then continues north into Somers, where it has a brief (0.02 mile) overlap with Route 190. Route 83 continues northwest, and crosses the Massachusetts state line into East Longmeadow.

In East Longmeadow, it proceeds north as Somers Road until a complex seven-way intersection (the East Longmeadow Rotary) that involves Route 186 and Route 220 among other roads. Beyond the Rotary, Route 83 continues northwest through East Longmeadow along North Main Street. After entering the city of Springfield, Route 83 shifts onto Belmont Avenue until it reaches a six-way intersection (known as "the X") where the route shifts again to Sumner Avenue. Route 83 follows Sumner Avenue to its end then turns south on Longhill Street, which provides access to the ramps leading to I-91 and US 5.

History
In the 1920s, the segment from Glastonbury to Manchester was called State Highway 164, while the segment from Manchester to Somers was called State Highway 108. The current Route 83 was established from these two state highways in the 1932 renumbering. At about the same time, Massachusetts extended the route through East Longmeadow and Springfield as a town-maintained road. In Connecticut, the only significant changes since then have been the straightening of a few curves. In Massachusetts, the construction of I-91 and relocation of US 5 led to the realignment of the northern end of Route 83 to its modern route along the I-91 ramps.

Major intersections

References

External links

083
Transportation in Hartford County, Connecticut
Transportation in Tolland County, Connecticut
083
Transportation in Hampden County, Massachusetts
Glastonbury, Connecticut
Manchester, Connecticut
Vernon, Connecticut
Ellington, Connecticut
Somers, Connecticut
Springfield, Massachusetts
Springfield metropolitan area, Massachusetts